Alfred Bramwell Cook  (7 March 1903 – 1 June 1994) was a New Zealand Salvation Army leader and doctor. He was born in Gisborne, New Zealand, on 7 March 1903.

In the 1982 New Year Honours, Cook was appointed a Commander of the Order of the British Empire, for services to the Salvation Army and the community.

References

1903 births
1994 deaths
20th-century New Zealand medical doctors
New Zealand Salvationists
People from Gisborne, New Zealand
New Zealand Commanders of the Order of the British Empire
New Zealand hospital administrators
20th-century Methodists